Harold John Finlay (22 March 1901 – 7 April 1951) was a New Zealand palaeontologist and conchologist.

Biography
Finlay was born in Comilla, India (now Bangladesh), on 22 March 1901. He was left a paraplegic after contracting poliomyelitis at the age of four, but waas able to participate in field excursions. He graduated from the University of Otago with B.Sc. and M.Sc. He received the Hamilton Memorial Prize of the New Zealand Institute in 1926 and a D.Sc. in 1927. His main research interest was marine and non-marine malacofauna of New Zealand, both recent and fossil. He also specialised on fossil Foraminifera.

After a long period of unemployment, Finlay was appointed to the Geological Survey of New Zealand in 1937, and in the same year he married Jean Dorothy Waterson Gillies. He was elected a Fellow of the Royal Society of New Zealand in 1939, and was awarded the scoiety's Hector Memorial Medal in 1941.

Finlay died, unexpectedly, at his home in Wellington on 7 April 1951.

Bibliography
Many of Finlay's works were published in Transactions and Proceedings of the Royal Society of New Zealand abbreviated as Trans. N.Z. Inst.

(incomplete; complete only for publications from Trans. N.Z. Inst.)

1923
 Finlay H. J. 1923. Some Remarks on New Zealand Calliostomidae, with Descriptions of New Tertiary Species. Trans. N.Z. Inst., vol. 54, pp. 99–105.
 Finlay H. J. & McDowall F. H. 1923. Fossiliferous Limestone at Dowling Bay. Trans. N.Z. Inst., vol. 54, pp. 106–114.

1924
 Finlay H. J. 1924. A Chemical Investigation of Pintsch Oil. Trans. N.Z. Inst., Volume 55, 1924, 
 Finlay H. J. 1924. Three Fossil Annelids new to New Zealand. Trans. N.Z. Inst., Volume 55, 1924, 
 Finlay H. J. 1924. New shells from New Zealand Tertiary Beds. Trans. N.Z. Inst., vol. 55, 1924, pp. 450–479.
 Finlay H. J. 1924. New Zealand Tertiary Rissoids. Trans. N.Z. Inst. vol 55, 1924, pp. 480–490.
 Finlay H. J. 1924. The Molluscan Fauna of Target Gully. Trans. N.Z. Inst., vol 55, 1924, pp. 494–516.
 Finlay H. J. 1924. Additions to the Recent Molluscan Fauna of New Zealand. Trans. N.Z. Inst., vol 55, 1924, pp. 517–526.
 Finlay H. J. 1924. The Family Liotiidae, Iredale, in the New Zealand Tertiary: Part 1—The Genus Brookula. Trans. N.Z. Inst., vol 55, 1924, pp. 526–531.
 Finlay H. J. & McDowall F. H. 1924. Preliminary Note on the Clifden Beds. Trans. N.Z. Inst., vol. 55, pp. 534–538.
 Finlay H. J. 1924. Two New Species of Magadina. Trans. N.Z. Inst., Volume 55, 1924, 
 Finlay H. J. 1924. Some necessary changes in Names of New Zealand Mollusca. Proc. Mal. Soc. (Lond.), vol. 16, pt. 2, pp. 99–107.
 Finlay H. J. 1924. List of Recorded Relationships between Australian and New Zealand Mollusca. Rep. Austr. Assoc. Adv. Sci., vol. 16, pp. 332–343.

1925
 Finlay H. J. 1925 Some Modern Conceptions Applied to the Study of the Caenozoic Mollusca of New Zealand. Verbeek Mem. Birthday Vol., pp. 161–172.

1926
 Finlay H. J. 1926 New Shells from New Zealand Tertiary Beds: Part 2. Trans. N.Z. Inst., vol. 56, 1926, pp. 227–258.
 Finlay H. J. 1926 On Iredalina, new genus: a Volute without plaits. Proc. Mal. Soc. (Lond.), vol. 17, pt. 1, pp. 59–62.

1927
 Finlay H. J. 1927. Additions to the Recent Molluscan Fauna of New Zealand.—No. 2. Trans. N.Z. Inst., Volume 57, 1927, pp. 485–487
 Finlay H. J. (19 January) 1927. New Specific Names for Austral Mollusca. Trans. N.Z. Inst., Volume 57, 1927, pp. 488–533.
 Finlay H. J. (23 December) 1927. A Further Commentary on New Zealand Molluscan Systematics. Transactions and Proceedings of the Royal Society of New Zealand, Volume 57, 1927, 320-485.

1928
 Finlay H. J. 1928. The Recent Mollusca of the Chatham Islands. Trans. N.Z. Inst., Volume 59, 1928, pp. 232–286

1930
 Finlay H. J. (23 August) 1930. Additions to the Recent Molluscan Fauna of New Zealand. No. 3. Trans. N.Z. Inst., Volume 61, 222-247. (PDF)
 Finlay H. J. 1930. Invalid Molluscan Names. No. 1. Trans. N.Z. Inst., Volume 61, 1930
 Finlay H. J. 1930. New Shells from New Zealand Tertiary Beds. Part 3. Trans. N.Z. Inst., Volume 61, 1930, pp. 49–84
 Finlay H. J. 1930. Notes on Recent Papers dealing with the Mollusca of New Zealand. Trans. N.Z. Inst., Volume 61, 1930, pp. 248–258
 Finlay H. J. 1930. Revision of the New Zealand. Shells Referred to Fusinus. Trans. N.Z. Inst., Volume 61, 1930

1931
 Finlay H. J. 1931–1932. On Turbo postulatus Bartrum: Does it indicate a Pliocene Connection with Australia? Trans. N.Z. Inst., Volume 62, 1931–32
 Finlay H. J. 1931–1932. On Austrosassia, Austroharpa, and Austrolithes, New Genera; with some Remarks on the Gasteropod Protoconch. Trans. N.Z. Inst., Volume 62, 1931–32, pp. 7–19
 Finlay H. J. 1931–1932. On the Occurrence of Strebloceras in New Zealand. Trans. N.Z. Inst., Volume 62, 1931–32
 Finlay H. J. & Laws C. R. (23 May) 1931. A Second Species of Planorbis from New Zealand. Trans. N.Z. Inst. Volume 62, 1931–32. 23-25.

1938
 Finlay H. J. 1938–1939. New Zealand Foraminifera: Key Species in Stratigraphy—No. 1. Trans. N.Z. Inst., Volume 68, 1938–39, 
 Finlay H. J. 1938–1939. New Zealand Foraminifera: The Occurrence of Rzehakina, Hantkenina, Rotaliatina, and Zeauvigerina. Trans. N.Z. Inst., Volume 68, 1938–39

1940
 Finlay H. J. 1940. New Zealand Foraminifera: Key Species in Stratigraphy. No. 2. Trans. N.Z. Inst., Volume 69, 1940
 Finlay H. J. & Marwick J. 1940. The Divisions of the Upper Cretaceous and Tertiary in New Zealand. Trans. Roy. Soc. N.Z., vol. 70, pp. 77–135.

1946
 Finlay H. J. 1946–1947. The Microfaunas of the Oxford Chalk and Eyre River Beds. Trans. N.Z. Inst., Volume 76, 1946–47, 
 Finlay H. J. 1946–1947. The Foraminiferal Evidence for Tertiary Trans-Tasman Correlation. Trans. N.Z. Inst., Volume 76, 1946–47

1947
 Finlay H. J. & Marwick J. 1947. New Divisions of the New Zealand Upper Cretaceous and Tertiary. N.Z. Journ. Sci. Tech., vol. 28, (sec. B), pp. 230–236.

1950
 Benson W. N. & Finlay H. J. 1950. A Post-Tertiary Micro-Fauna in a Concretion Containing Cancer novae-zealandiae. Trans. N.Z. Inst., Volume 78, 1950, 269-270.

References

 Scott, G. H. Finlay, Harold John 1901 – 1951.  Dictionary of New Zealand Biography, updated 22 June 2007

Further reading 
 Rehder H. A. (July) 1952. Harold John Finlay, 1901–1951. The Nautilus 66(1): 30-31.
 Hornbrook N. de B. (July) 1951. The Micropaleontologist. volume 5, number 3.
 Finlay, A. M. (July) 1981. H. J. Finlay, 1901—1951. Geological Society of New Zealand. Newsletter No 53 (July 1981): 29—30 
 Hornbrook, N. de B. (December) 1971. Finlay & Marwick. New Zealand Journal of Geology and Geophysics 14, No 4 (Dec. 1971): 640—654 
 Hornbrook, N. de B. 1975. Harold J. Finlay (1901–1951). New Zealand's Nature Heritage 59 (1975): facing 1656

External links 
 https://nzetc.victoria.ac.nz/tm/scholarly/name-207944.html

New Zealand paleontologists
1901 births
1951 deaths
University of Otago alumni
Micropaleontologists
Fellows of the Royal Society of New Zealand
20th-century New Zealand scientists